Rafael Matos and David Vega Hernández defeated Ariel Behar and Gonzalo Escobar in the final, 7–6(7–5), 6–7(6–8), [10–1] to win the doubles tennis title at the 2022 Mallorca Championships. The pair earned their second ATP Tour doubles title of the season and first grass victory together.

Simone Bolelli and Máximo González were the defending champions, but only González returned to defend his title, partnering with Andrey Golubev. They lost in the first round to Aslan Karatsev and Joran Vliegen.

Seeds

Draw

Draw

References

External links
Main draw

Mallorca Championships - Doubles